The New Caledonia national under-20 football team is the national U-20 team of New Caledonia and is controlled by the New Caledonian Football Federation.

History

Competition record

OFC
The OFC Under 20 Qualifying Tournament is a tournament held once every two years to decide the two qualification spots for the Oceania Football Confederation (OFC) and its representatives at the FIFA U-20 World Cup.

FIFA U-20 World Cup

Current squad
The following players have been called up for the squad for the 2018 OFC U-19 Championship from 5 to 18 August 2018. Names in italics denote players who have been capped for the Senior team.

2016 squad
The following players were called up for the 2016 OFC U-20 Championship from 3 to 17 September 2016. Names in italics denote players who have been capped for the Senior team.

Caps and goals as of 13 September 2016 after the game against New Caledonia.

Fixtures and results

2016

2018

References

External links
 New Caledonian Football Federation official website

under-20
Oceanian national under-20 association football teams